Ressano Garcia Thermal Power Station is a  natural gas-fired thermal power plant located in the town of Ressano Garcia in the Maputo Province of Mozambique.

Location
The power station is located in the town of Ressano Garcia, in the Moamba District of Maputo Province. This is in extreme southwestern Mozambique, adjacent to the international border with South Africa. The coordinates of the power station are 25°27'42.0"S, 32°00'19.0"E (Latitude:-25.461667; Longitude:32.005278).

Overview
The power station is jointly owned by (a) Electricidade de Moçambique, the Mozambican electricity utility monopoly company and (b) Sasol New Energy, a 100 percent subsidiary of Sasol Limited, a South Africa-based chemical and energy conglomerate. The table below illustrates the shareholding in the power station, as of January 2021.

The power station uses natural gas, sourced from Mozambican gas fields, conveyed to the plant via the Temane–Secunda Gas Pipeline that transports the gas from Temane, in the Mozambican gas fields, to Secunda in South Africa.Construction
The engineering, procurement and construction (EPC) contract was awarded to Gigawatt Mozambique, SA, a subsidiary of South African-based Gigajoule Group, a company that develops, operates and invests in sustainable energy projects in Southern Africa.

The power station was designed to have maximum capacity of 350 megawatts. Since 2015, it has been gradually, progressively built and expanded to reach capacity of 175 megawatts. As of August 2020, US$280 million had been invested so far to that stage, including US$200 spent on construction.

Operation
The power station sells the energy it produces to the national utility company, Electricidade de Moçambique, under a 25-year power purchase agreement. The natural gas that the plant burns to produce the electricity, is supplied by Matola Gas Company, another subsidiary of the Gigajoule Group. The electricity supplies (a) the city of Maputo (b) Maputo Province and (c) some is sold to the Southern African Power Pool. Plans are underway to expand the power station to 350 megawatts.

In December 2017, the power station was re-financed to the tune of US$189 million. The table below identifies the sources of funds for the refinance:

Change in ownership
In December 2020, Sasol Limited, the minority shareholder in this power station, signed binding paperwork, transferring its 49 percent shareholding to Azura Power Limited'' of Nigeria, for consideration of US$145 million. The transaction is subject to regulatory approval in Mozambique and is subordinate to first right of refusal (pre-emption rights) by the majority shareholder, EDM.

See also

List of power stations in Mozambique

References

External links
 Mozambique: Ressano Garcia Power Station Increases Revenue As of 22 August 2020.

Natural gas-fired power stations in Mozambique
Energy infrastructure completed in 2016
Maputo Province
2016 establishments in Mozambique